The discography of Tedashii, an American Christian hip hop artist, consists of six studio albums, including three as a founding member of the group 116 Clique, a remix album and an EP both by 116 Clique, fourteen singles, including five as a featured performer and two with 116 Clique, thirteen music videos, including seven as a featured performer and two with 116 Clique, a contributed track to a compilation album, and twenty-four guest appearances.

Albums

Studio albums

EPs

With 116 Clique

EPs

With Reach Records

Playlists

Collaborative albums

Singles

As lead artist

As featured performer

- Watch them fall     (2020)                          Unsecret (featuring Tedashii and Sam Tinnesz)
-Adrenaline         (2020)                            Unsecret (featuring Tedashii and Sam Tinnesz)

With 116 Clique

Other charted songs

Guest appearances

Music videos

As lead artist

As a featured performer

With 116 Clique

References

Discographies of American artists
Hip hop discographies
Christian music discographies